Christopher Volz (born August 6, 1973) is an American singer who is best known as the lead vocalist of the nu metal band Flaw and as the former lead vocalist of Five Bolt Main. In 2007, Volz released a solo album through the independent record label Rock Ridge Music, titled Redemption. The collective projects of Volz have sold around 750,000 units in the United States (most of which with Flaw). The band has continued to record and tour and was involved in a plagiarism scandal in 2019 after which Volz fired guitarist Tommy Gibbons. Volz and the band appeared on The Late Show with Stephen Colbert in 2018.

Music career 
On November 16, 2009, Flaw independently released Home Grown Studio Sessions. This is the first new material to be released by Flaw since Endangered Species in 2004.

Volz announced that he was trying to rekindle relationships with other members of Flaw to release their fourth studio album and an EP by mid-2012 with a DVD release to follow, as well as work on Five.Bolt.Main material and solo material. He also announced that Flaw will be touring in mid March.

On July 17, 2013, it was announced that the band had returned to the "Through the Eyes" lineup of Volz, Jason Daunt, Lance Arny, Ryan Juhrs and Chris Ballinger. They have stated they are working on a new album and rehearsing for live shows in August 2013.

In March 2021, multiple publications reported that Volz had repeatedly used racial slurs at a concert, leading to him being dropped by the record label that distributes his side project and solo albums.

Biography
Chris Volz grew up in the Maryland area, studying music at an early age. He currently is based in Louisville, Kentucky. During his childhood, Volz was raised by his father Joe and until he was 11 or 12, his adoptive mother Helga. At the age of 2, Volz was adopted by Helga, a female singer. Helga taught him about music. When he was 11 or 12, Helga died by suicide.

Volz cites jazz, classical, and metal music as some of his influences. His singing style consists of both melodic singing and intense screaming vocals. The songs "Whole" from the Flaw album Through The Eyes and "The Gift" from the Five.Bolt.Main album Venting are about Helga. He spoke about the Flaw song "Whole" and Helga, saying, "Everything in that song touches from sadness to anger to grief to blaming myself to confusion...I just really wanted to go as deep into it as I possibly could and still be able to come back. She was the one who got me into music. She was an operatic singer, and for me to go wholly into music has kept a part of her alive inside of me." He said that before he found out Helga adopted him, he thought she was his birth mom.

After Helga committed suicide, Volz started disrespecting authority figures such as his teachers and his father Joe. Joe shipped him off to military school. Volz ran away from school to hang out with his neighborhood friends. According to Joe, Volz got "quickly booted out for using drugs and lying about it". This got Volz sent by Joe to various juvenile detention centers. Volz was sent to a long-term drug rehab center after Joe caught him with a homemade bong. Volz ran away from rehab and then was picked up by police and subsequently put in a juvenile detention center. The court decided he was not a candidate for rehab and Joe was told by the police to take his son back. This made Joe embittered with his son. Volz attended Bowie High School in Maryland but dropped out. After his childhood, Volz started getting along with Joe. Joe was the best man at Volz's wedding.

Discography

References

1973 births
American heavy metal singers
Nu metal singers
People from Bowie, Maryland
Republic Records artists
Universal Records artists
Alternative metal musicians
American hard rock musicians
Living people
Rock Ridge Music artists
Musicians from Louisville, Kentucky
21st-century American singers
21st-century American male singers
Obscenity controversies in music